Boulaide is a commune and small town in north-western Luxembourg. It is part of the canton of Wiltz, which is part of the district of Diekirch.  As of 2009, it has a total population of 926.

The commune is composed of three villages: Boulaide, Baschleiden, and Surré.

In 1976 the township has erected a monument in honor of the 35th Infantry Division, who liberated the town during World War II.

Boulaide is also a part of the European Road of Freedom. This project was initiated by the Jewish Painter and Sculptor Otto Freundlich, who was killed in a German concentration camp during World War II. Together with his friend Jeanne Kosnick-Kloss he had planned to create two sculpture roads. The first one was supposed to go from North to South and they had called it "The road of human fraternity". The second one was supposed to go from West to East and its name was "the road of human solidarity and the memory of the liberation"  At the intersection of the two roads in Auvers-sur-Oise in France they had planned to erect a high tower called "the Lighttower of peace by means of the seven arts". But Otto Freundlich could not carry out his plans and so some 35 years ago, the German artist Leo Kornbrust took over the project and now the plans are to create a road of sculptures from the landing coast in France to Moscow in Russia. In Boulaide this Road of Freedom is present through a group of wooden sculptures, created by the luxemburgish artist Marie Josée Kerschen.

In 2022, the band Grandpa Charlie released the song BOULAIDE! in honour of the commune, which gained much attention around Luxembourg.

Population

References

External links
 

 
Communes in Wiltz (canton)
Towns in Luxembourg